Gluckstadt is a city in Madison County, Mississippi, United States. It was a census-designated place and unincorporated community until the municipal incorporation of the City of Gluckstadt became effective in June 2021. The city is located along Interstate 55 in south central Madison County, between the cities of Canton and Madison. It is part of the Jackson Metropolitan Statistical Area.

History
Gluckstadt was established in June 1905 by several German Catholic families from Klaasville, Lake County,  Indiana. The community's name translated into English means "Lucky Town." There is also a town in Germany that has the name Glückstadt.

Each year, a German Festival is held in Gluckstadt on the grounds of St. Joseph Catholic Church. In 1964 civil rights workers ran a freedom school in Gluckstadt.  It was firebombed and burned but the school continued to meet in the ashes of its former location.  In the Fall of 1964 some of the people who had attended the freedom school in Gluckstadt moved to the one in Canton.

In 2021, the Mississippi Supreme Court ruled that Gluckstadt may incorporate into Mississippi's newest city.  The new city is represented by Mayor Walter Morrison IV and Aldermen Jayce Powell, Lisa Williams, John Taylor, Miya Warfield Bates and Wesley Slay.

Demographics

2020 census

As of the 2020 United States Census, there were 3,208 people.

Education
Public education for most of the city is provided by the Madison County School District.

The city is served by two elementary schools (grades K-5), Madison Crossing and Mannsdale, by Germantown Middle School (grades 6-8), and by Germantown High School (grades 9-12).  In 2009, Madison County School District granted Gluckstadt a high school when Madison Central became overcrowded. Before the establishment of Germantown High, Madison Crossing Elementary, Mannsdale Elementary, and Germantown Middle were feeder schools to Madison Central.

A section of the city is part of the Canton School District.

Subdivisions
Gluckstadt has 50 subdivisions: 25 for Mannsdale Elementary and 25 for Madison Crossing Elementary.

Government
In 2021, Walter C. Morrison IV became Gluckstadt's first mayor. Lindsay Kellum was hired as City Clerk, the first employee hired for the new municipality.

Notable people
Aaron Shirley, physician and MacArthur Fellow.

References

External links
St. Joseph Catholic Church

German-American culture in Mississippi
Former census-designated places in Mississippi
Jackson metropolitan area, Mississippi
Populated places established in 1905
1905 establishments in Mississippi